The Vernon Wildlife Area is a  tract of protected land located in Waukesha County, Wisconsin, managed by the Wisconsin Department of Natural Resources (WDNR). The first parcel of land to be used for the Wildlife Area was leased in 1946 to function as a public hunting ground, focusing primarily on small game and various game birds. The Vernon Wildlife Area is one of ten state protected areas included in the Southern Kettle Moraine Region Planning Group, a WDNR classified area.

Flora
There are 14 prominent tree species in the wildlife area, including one species non-native to the region and Wisconsin in general (Norway maple). Native species include; shagbark hickory, black cherry, red maple, white ash, swamp ash, sugar maple, swamp birch, American basswood, eastern cottonwood, river birch, swamp white oak, silver maple, and American elm.

Besides species of trees, there are seven major types of brush that may be found in the wildlife area, including buckthorn, honeysuckle, dogwoods, canary grass, reed grass, garlic mustard, and narrowleaf cattail.

Land cover

Vernon Fen
The Vernon Fen is a Calcareous Fen located within the boundaries of the greater Wildlife Area. The Fen features peat soil and sloping hills, complete with multiple types of sedges. The Fen is home to multiple small springs that feed into the Fox River. The Fen is characterized by beak-rush and short-headed rush (Juncus brachycephalus).

Recreation
The Vernon Wildlife Area was founded with the intent to create public hunting grounds in Waukesha, and as such the WDNR has made keeping game populations steady a focal point of their preservation efforts. Opportunities for hunting and trapping of mourning doves, deer, ring-necked pheasant, and turkey are available.

Fishing is also a popular activity according to the WDNR, with the Mill Brook (a passively managed Class 2 trout stream classed as an Exceptional Resource Water by the WDNR) being a key access point for trout fishing.

References

External links
U.S. Geological Survey Map at the U.S. Geological Survey Map Website. Retrieved March 20, 2022.
Map of Vernon Wildlife Area at the WDNR Website. Retrieved March 23, 2022.
Map of Trout Streams in Waukesha County at the WDNR Website. Retrieved March 25, 2022.

State Wildlife Areas of Wisconsin
Protected areas of Wisconsin
Geography of Waukesha County, Wisconsin
Protected areas established in 1946